Nigdi is an affluent suburb in the city of Pune, India. Bhakti Shakti, Nigdi is considered as the gateway to Pune. Nigdi Pradhikaran is also an important administration locality for industrial area Pimpri Chinchwad. Nigdi is a well developed locality with property rates being high in and around Bhakti Shakti and in  Pradhikaran localities. Nigdi is also home to Pimpri Chinchwad New Town Development Authority, GST bhavan, Kendriya Sadan - Pune CBI headquarters and many more. Nigdi is near to Akurdi, Dehu road and Chinchwad railway station. There is a bus terminal at Bhakti Shakti, Nigdi where you get buses to every corner of the city. Luxury travels and State Transport buses are also easily available in Nigdi.

Places of interest

India's Tallest Flag Pole
Ganesh Talav (lake)
Durga Tekdi
Appu Ghar
Bhakti Shakti
Sunset Point
Dhingra Maidan
Transport Nagari
Shri Krishna Temple 
Bhel Chowk

Hospitals
 Lokmanya Hospital – Sector 24
 Sterling Multispecialty Hospital and Research Centre – Sector 27
 Diwan Hospital – Sector 24
 Apollo Clinic – Sector 25, Near Bhel Chowk
 Anand - Foresight Hospital – Sector 26
 Dhanwantari Hospital – Sector 27
 Ranna Hospital – Sector 21
 Kartik Hospital – Sector 27A, Opposite Ashoka Bus Stop
 Shakun Clinic Children's Hospital – Behind Nigdi bus stand
 Bhalerao ENT Hospital	 - Near Mahaslkant Chowk
 Ojas Multispeciality Hospital – sector 32 A, Ravet
 Shende Hospital – Sector 25
 Gandhi Nursing Home- Sector 24
 Panortho Hospital- Near Sambhaji Chowk

Government Offices
Kendriya Sadan, Nr. Akurdi Railway station
CBI Pune HQ
PMRDA Headquarter
Pratyaksha Kar Bhavan (Income Tax Office), Akurdi Station Road.
GST Bhavan, Akurdi Station Road.
Zoological Survey Of India, Ravet Road.
LIC Training Center
PCMC 'A' Zone Office, Spine Road, Bhel Chauk.
PCMC 'F' Zone Office, Tilak Road.
Maha Vitaran Pradhikaran Sub-Division Office, Kachghar Chauk.
PCMC Hedgewar Bhavan, Near Chhatrapati Shivaji Swimming Pool.
Post office, Sector 26
Civil Court, Sector 28
Tehsildar Office, Sector 24
Provident Fund Office

Schools and Colleges

Transportation

Akurdi Railway Station of Pune Suburban Railway is in Sector-26 of Nigdi Pradhikaran. All local trains stops there. Nigdi is well connected to Pune City by buses leaving from Nigdi Bus terminal of Pune Mahanagar Parivahan Mahamandal Limited. There are PMPML buses available to Swargate, Kothrud, Hinjawadi, Katraj, Bhosari, Pune Station, Yerwada, Lonavala,Hadapsar, Wadgaon, Talegaon, Shirgaon etc. Mumbai Pune highway goes through Nigdi.
Chinchwad Railway Station of Pune Suburban Railway is in Chinchwad near Nigdi.

References

Neighbourhoods in Pimpri-Chinchwad